In number theory,  sexy primes are prime numbers that differ from each other by 6.

The term "sexy prime" is a pun stemming from the Latin word for six: .

In August 2014 the Polymath group, seeking the proof of the twin prime conjecture, showed that if the generalized Elliott–Halberstam conjecture is proven, one can show the existence of infinitely many pairs of consecutive primes that differ by at most 6 and as such they are either twin, cousin or sexy primes.

Primorial n# notation 

As used in this article, # stands for the product 2 · 3 · 5 · 7 · … of all the primes ≤ .

Types of groupings

Sexy prime pairs 

(5,11), (7,13), (11,17), (13,19), (17,23), (23,29), (31,37), (37,43), (41,47), (47,53), (53,59), (61,67), (67,73), (73,79), (83,89), (97,103), (101,107), (103,109), (107,113), (131,137), (151,157), (157,163), (167,173), (173,179), (191,197), (193,199), (223,229), (227,233), (233,239), (251,257), (257,263), (263,269), (271,277), (277,283), (307,313), (311,317), (331,337), (347,353), (353,359), (367,373), (373,379), (383,389), (433,439), (443,449), (457,463), (461,467).

, the largest-known pair of sexy primes was found by S. Batalov and has 51,934 digits. The primes are:
 11922002779 x (2172486 - 286243) + 286245 - 5
 11922002779 x (2172486 - 286243) + 286245 + 1

Sexy prime triplets 
Sexy primes can be extended to larger constellations. Triplets of primes (+6, +12) such that +18 is composite are called sexy prime triplets. Those below 1,000 are :

(7,13,19), (17,23,29), (31,37,43), (47,53,59), (67,73,79), (97,103,109), (101,107,113), (151,157,163), (167,173,179), (227,233,239), (257,263,269), (271,277,283), (347,353,359), (367,373,379), (557,563,569), (587,593,599), (607,613,619), (647,653,659), (727,733,739), (941,947,953), (971,977,983).

In January 2005 Ken Davis set a record for the largest-known sexy prime triplet with 5132 digits:
 (84055657369 · 205881 · 4001# · (205881 · 4001# + 1) + 210) · (205881 · 4001# - 1) / 35 + 1.  
 
In May 2019, Peter Kaiser improved this record to 6,031 digits:
 10409207693×220000−1.

Gerd Lamprecht improved the record to 6,116 digits in August 2019:
 20730011943×14221#+344231.

Ken Davis further improved the record with a 6,180 digit Brillhart-Lehmer-Selfridge provable triplet in October 2019:
 (72865897*809857*4801#*(809857*4801#+1)+210)*(809857*4801#-1)/35+1

Norman Luhn & Gerd Lamprecht improved the record to 6,701 digits in October 2019:
 22582235875×222224+1.

Serge Batalov improved the record to 15,004 digits in April 2022: 
 2494779036241x249800+1.

Sexy prime quadruplets
Sexy prime quadruplets (+6, +12, +18) can only begin with primes ending in a 1 in their decimal representation (except for the quadruplet with 5). The sexy prime quadruplets below 1000 are :
(5,11,17,23), (11,17,23,29), (41,47,53,59), (61,67,73,79), (251,257,263,269), (601,607,613,619), (641,647,653,659).

In November 2005 the largest-known sexy prime quadruplet, found by Jens Kruse Andersen had 1,002 digits:
  411784973 · 2347# + 3301.

In September 2010 Ken Davis announced a 1,004 digit quadruplet with   23333 + 1582534968299.

In May 2019 Marek Hubal announced a 1,138 digit quadruplet with  1567237911 × 2677# + 3301.

In June 2019 Peter Kaiser announced a 1,534 digit quadruplet with  19299420002127 × 25050 + 17233.

In October 2019 Gerd Lamprecht and Norman Luhn announced a 3,025 digit quadruplet with  121152729080 × 7019#/1729 + 1.

Sexy prime quintuplets 
In an arithmetic progression of five terms with common difference 6, one of the terms must be divisible by 5, because 5 and 6 are relatively prime. However, all multiples of 5 (except itself) cannot be prime numbers. Thus, the only sexy prime quintuplet is (5,11,17,23,29); no longer sequence of sexy primes is possible, since adding 6 to the last number in the set of sexy prime quintuplets (29) equals 35, which is a composite number.

See also 
 Cousin prime (two primes that differ by 4)
 Prime k-tuple
 Twin prime (two primes that differ by 2)

References 

  Retrieved on 2007-02-28 (requires composite +18 in a sexy prime triplet, but no other similar restrictions)

External links
 

Classes of prime numbers
Unsolved problems in number theory